Mr. Justice or Mister Justice may refer to

Comics
Mister Justice, a Marvel Comics character
Mr. Justice, an MLJ Comics / Archie Comics character; see Terrific Three

Literature
Mr. Justice Raffles, a novel
Mr. Justice Raffles (film), its film adaptation

Judicial title
The title in office of judges in various courts in common law jurisdictions, including:
High Court judge (England and Wales)
Federal and state court judges in Australia
Federal and provincial court judges in Canada
High Court of New Zealand and Supreme Court of New Zealand judges in New Zealand
High Court (Hong Kong) and Court of Final Appeal (Hong Kong) judges in Hong Kong